Photedes is a genus of moths of the family Noctuidae.

Species
 Photedes albivena (Christoph, 1887)
 Photedes amseli (Boursin, 1961)
 Photedes captiuncula (Treitschke, 1825)
 Photedes carterae Schweitzer, 1983
 Photedes defecta (Grote, 1874)
 Photedes delattini (Wiltshire, 1953)
 Photedes deserticola (Staudinger, 1899)
 Photedes didonea (Smith, 1894)
 Photedes enervata (Guenée, 1852)
 Photedes extrema (Hübner, 1809)
 Photedes homora (Bethune-Baker, 1911)
 Photedes improba (Staudinger, 1899)
 Photedes includens (Walker, 1858)
 Photedes inops (Grote, 1881)
 Photedes minima (Haworth, 1809)
 Photedes panatela (Smith, 1904)
 Photedes urbahni (Boursin, 1956)

References
Natural History Museum Lepidoptera genus database
Photedes at funet

Hadeninae